Miss Universe 1993, the 42nd Miss Universe pageant, was held on 21 May 1993 at the Auditorio Nacional in Mexico City, Mexico. At the event's conclusion, Dayanara Torres of Puerto Rico was crowned Miss Universe by outgoing titleholder Michelle McLean of Namibia. Seventy-nine contestants competed in the pageant.

The pageant was hosted by Dick Clark for the fourth and final time, with colour commentary from former Miss Universe titleholders Cecilia Bolocco (1987) and Angela Visser (1989).

This was the third time the pageant was held in Mexico, two years after Lupita Jones won Mexico's first Miss Universe title in 1991. In the weeks prior to the final telecast, the contestants visited Campeche, Oaxaca, Zacatecas, Querétaro and the Mexican borough of Xochimilco for official events and sight seeing.

The pageant was marred by booing from the crowd following the failure of the Mexican delegate, Angelina González, to advance to the top 10 of the national costume competition or the finals as one of the top 10 semifinalists. This was particularly directed towards Kenya Moore of the US, the country that owns the Miss Universe Organization. During the judges' introduction, booing increased especially after Mexican judges José Luis Cuevas and Miss Universe 1991 Lupita Jones were introduced to the audience who held them responsible for Miss Mexico's non-placement.

This continued throughout the first two events of the night: the swimsuit and interview competition. The audience at National Auditorium only calmed down after the musical number with Michelle McLean and the delegates sang and danced to "Get on Your Feet" . Generalized booing stopped and the competition continued with the evening gown event, the judges' questions, the final question and the crowning, without major incident.

Results

Placements

Final Competition

Special Awards

Order of Announcements

Top 10

Top 6

Top 3

Contestants

  - Alicia Andrea Ramón
  - Dyane Escalona
  - Voni Delfos
  - Rosemary Bruckner
  - Marietta Ricina Sands
  - Sandra Joine
  - Melanie Smith
  - Roxana Arias Becerra
  - Leila  Schuster
  - Rhonda Hodge
  - Lilia Koeva
  - Nancy Ann Elder
  - Pamela Ebanks
  - Savka Pollak Tomasevic
  - Paula Andrea Betancur Arroyave
  - Catalina Rodriguez
  - Elsa Roozendal
  - Photini Spyridonos
  - Pavlina Baburkova
  - Maria Hirse
  - Odalisse Rodriguez
  - Arianna Mandini Klein
  - Katherine Mendez
  - Kersti Tänavsuu
  - Tarja Smura
  - Veronique de la Cruz
  - Verona Feldbusch
  - Jamila Haruna Danzuru
  - Kathryn Middleton
  - Kristina Manoussi
  - Charlene Gumataotao
  - Diana Galván
  - Denia Marlen Reyes
  - Emily Lo
  - Zsanna Pardy
  - Maria Run Haflidadóttir
  - Namrata Shirodkar
  - Sharon Ellis
  - Yana Khodyrker
  - Elisa Jacassi
  - Rachel Stuart
  - Yukiko Shiki
  - Samaya Chadrawi
  - Nathalie dos Santos
  - Lucy Narayanasamy
  - Roberta Borg
  - Danielle Pascal
  - Angelina González
  - Anja Schroder
  - Angelique van Zalen
  - Karly Dawn Kinnaird
  - Luisa Amalia Urcuyo
  - Rhihole Gbinigie
  - Victoria Taisakan Todela
  - Ine Beate Strand
  - Giselle Amelia Gonzales
  - Carolina Barrios
  - Déborah de Souza-Peixoto
  - Melinda Joanna Tanseco Gallardo
  - Marzena Wolska
  - Carla Marisa da Cruz
  - Dayanara Torres
  - Angelica Nicoara
  - Renagah Devi
  - Yoo Ha-young
  - Eugenia Santana
  - Chamila Wickramesinghe
  - Jean Zhang
  - Danila Faias
  - Johanna Lind
  - Valérie Bovard
  - Chattharika Ubolsiri
  - Rachel Charles
  - Ipek Gumusoglu
  - Michelle Mills
  - María Fernanda Navarro
  - Kenya Moore
  - Cheryl Simpson
  - Milka Yelisava Chulina Urbanich

Order of Introduction
The following table is the order of introduction in the Parade of Nations segment in the regional groups, randomly-ordered.

Notes

Debuts
  - Though Czechoslovakia was split, Pavlina Baburcova was actually the winner of Miss Czechoslovakia in 1992.

Returns
Last competed in 1991:

Withdrawals
 
  – The member countries are later competing individually from then on.
 
  – Split into Czech Republic and Slovakia on January 1, 1993.
 
  – Indira Sudiro withdrew because of the controversy in Indonesia.

Did not compete
  - Elizabeth Mwanza - did not compete due to undisclosed reasons, the country would only make its debut in 1995.

General references

References

External links
 Miss Universe official website

1993
1993 in Mexico
1993 beauty pageants
Beauty pageants in Mexico
Events in Mexico City
May 1993 events in Mexico